The Middle East steppe ecoregion (WWF ID: PA0812) stretches in an arc from southern Jordan across Syria and Iraq to the western border of Iran. The upper plains of the Tigris and Euphrates Rivers dominate most of the ecoregion.  The terrain is mostly open shrub steppe.  The climate is arid (less than 250 mm of precipitation per year).  Evidence is that this region was once more of a forest-steppe, but centuries of overgrazing and gathering firewood have reduced tree and grass cover to small areas and along the riverine corridors.  Despite the degraded condition of the steppe environment, the ecoregion is important for water birds as the rivers and reservoirs provide habitat in the arid region.

Location and description 
Most of the ecoregion is in upper Syria and Iraq, with a thin extension through western Jordan that almost reaches the Gulf of Aqaba in the south, and almost touching the border with Iran in the east. The ecoregion to the south is the Mesopotamian shrub desert, and to the north is the Eastern Mediterranean conifer-sclerophyllous-broadleaf forests ecoregion.

Climate 
The climate of the ecoregion is Hot semi-arid climates (Köppen climate classification (BSh)). This climate is characteristic of steppes, with hot summers and cool or mild winters, and minimal precipitation.  The coldest month averages above .  Precipitation averages less than 200 mm/year.

Flora and fauna 
The region is one of shrub steppe, crossed by riverine woodlands in places.  In deep, non-saline soils the dominant shrubs are white wormwood (Artemisia herba-alba), associated with bulbous bluegrass (Poa bulbosa).  Stonier soils support Hammada scoparia.  Areas near water support (Tamarix), Euphrates poplar (Populus euphratica), and reeds (Phragmites).  In less populated areas with vegetation, some large mammals are found, including the European badger (Meles meles), wild boar (Sus scrofa), and the vulnerable Arabian goitered gazelle (Gazella subgutturosa).   

For migratory water birds, the Euphrates River valley serves as a major migration route between the wetlands of Turkey and the wetlands of Iraq.  Many of these species depend on a combination of wetlands and arid desert habitat.  Birds in the ecoregion of conservation interest include vulnerable Houbara bustard (Chlamydotis undulata), the vulnerable Great bustard (Otis tarda), and the near-threatened Little bustard (Tetrax tetrax).

Protected areas 
Less than 1% of the ecoregion is officially protected.  These protected areas include:
 Wujib Nature Reserve (Jordan)
 Dana Biosphere Reserve (Jordan)
 Fifa Nature Reserve (Jordan)

References 

Palearctic ecoregions
Ecoregions of Jordan
Ecoregions of Syria
Ecoregions of Iraq